Casals Conducts: 1964 is a 1964 American short film directed by Larry Sturhahn. It is a documentary about the cellist and conductor Pablo Casals. It won an Oscar at the 37th Academy Awards in 1965 for Best Short Subject.  The Academy Film Archive preserved Casals Conducts: 1964 in 2013.

Cast
 Pablo Casals as Himself (archive footage)

References

External links

1964 films
1964 short films
1964 documentary films
American short documentary films
1960s short documentary films
Live Action Short Film Academy Award winners
Documentary films about classical music and musicians
1960s English-language films
1960s American films